Route 105 is a highway in Mississippi County, Missouri.  Its northern terminus is at Interstate 57/U.S. Route 60 in Charleston; its southern terminus is at Route 80 in East Prairie.  Other than the two termini, no other towns are on the route.

Route description

History
In 1924, Route 55 was designated along a concrete road starting from Benton to Wolf Island. A spur of Route 55, Route 55A, was designated one year later to a concrete road. Its western terminus was at the New Madrid–Mississippi county line, and its eastern terminus was at Route 55 north of East Prairie.

Major intersections

References

105
Transportation in Mississippi County, Missouri